The UNESCO (United Nations Educational, Scientific and Cultural Organization) has designated 175 World Heritage Sites in all of the 15 sovereign countries (also called "state parties") of Southern Europe: Albania, Andorra, Bosnia and Herzegovina, Croatia, Greece, Italy, Malta, Montenegro, North Macedonia, Portugal, San Marino, Serbia, Slovenia, Spain, and Vatican City as well as one site in the British Overseas Territory of Gibraltar. While Turkey has territory in Southern Europe, they are not included here but in Western Asia, and Cyprus is also included in Western Asia.

The top two countries by number of World Heritage Sites are located in this region: Italy with 58 sites and Spain with 49 sites (44 sites not including those on the Canary Islands, which are included in Africa). Seven sites are shared between several countries: Prehistoric Rock Art Sites in the Côa Valley and Siega Verde (Portugal and Spain), Rhaetian Railway in the Albula / Bernina Landscapes (Italy and Switzerland), Monte San Giorgio (Italy and Switzerland), Historic Centre of Rome, the Properties of the Holy See in that City Enjoying Extraterritorial Rights and San Paolo Fuori le Mura (Holy See and Italy), Pyrénées – Mont Perdu (France and Spain), Prehistoric Pile dwellings around the Alps (Austria, France, Germany, Italy, Slovenia and Switzerland) and Heritage of Mercury – Almadén and Idrija (Slovenia and Spain). The first sites from the region were inscribed in 1979 a year after the list's conception, and included six sites in the former Yugoslavia and one site in Italy. Each year, UNESCO's World Heritage Committee may inscribe new sites on the list, or delist sites that no longer meet the criteria. Selection is based on ten criteria: six for cultural heritage (i–vi) and four for natural heritage (vii–x). Some sites, designated "mixed sites," represent both cultural and natural heritage. In Southern Europe, there are 154 cultural, 16 natural, and 5 mixed sites.

The World Heritage Committee may also specify that a site is endangered, citing "conditions which threaten the very characteristics for which a property was inscribed on the World Heritage List." One of the sites (Medieval Monuments in Kosovo) in Southern Europe is listed as endangered and four sites (Old City of Dubrovnik, Natural and Culturo-Historical Region of Kotor, Plitvice Lakes National Park and Butrint) were previously listed. Possible danger listing has been considered by UNESCO in a number of other cases.

Legend

Site; named after the World Heritage Committee's official designation
Location; at city, regional, or provincial level and geocoordinates
Criteria; as defined by the World Heritage Committee
Area; in hectares and acres. If available, the size of the buffer zone has been noted as well. A value of zero implies that no data has been published by UNESCO
Year; during which the site was inscribed to the World Heritage List
Description; brief information about the site, including reasons for qualifying as an endangered site, if applicable

World Heritage Sites

See also
 List of World Heritage Sites in Albania
 List of World Heritage Sites in Bosnia and Herzegovina
 List of World Heritage Sites in Croatia
 List of World Heritage Sites in Greece
 List of World Heritage Sites in Italy
 List of World Heritage Sites in Malta
 List of World Heritage Sites in Montenegro
 List of World Heritage Sites in North Macedonia
 List of World Heritage Sites in Portugal
 List of World Heritage Sites in Serbia
 List of World Heritage Sites in Slovenia
 List of World Heritage Sites in Spain
 Vatican City is itself a World Heritage Site

Notes

References
General

Notes

Europe
Southern Europe